Middlesex County Cricket Club have appointed 37 permanent club captains since their foundation in 1864.

Official captains

External links 
 Middlesex club captains

Middlesex County Cricket Club

Middlesex
Middlesex